The Morane-Saulnier MoS-121, also known as the Morane-Saulnier MS.121 was a French fighter prototype of the 1920s. It was Morane-Saulnier's first fighter design after World War I.

Development
As a direct result of concern over the escalating cost of fighter manufacture, the French government and air force instituted a program for chasseurs légers or 'light fighters' in 1926. This was unofficially known as the 'Jockey' program, and it envisaged the use of moderate guns, minimal equipment and small amounts of ammunition. Emphasis was placed on climb rate, endurance and a ceiling (high for the time) of 8000 metres. To meet this requirement, Morane-Saulnier designed the MoS-121, renamed the MS 121 in 1927, as a single-seat parasol monoplane of mixed construction.

Operational history
After flying for the first time in mid-1927, it proved underpowered and incapable of climbing easily and was discarded in favour of the Morane-Saulnier MS.221.

Specifications (MoS-121)

References

Further reading

Single-engined tractor aircraft
MS.121
1920s French fighter aircraft